Brian Baldridge (born January 21, 1969) is a former member of the Ohio House of Representatives, representing the 90th district from 2019 until his resignation in 2023.  He is a Republican.  The district comprises Adams and Scioto counties as well as a portion of Lawrence county. Baldridge is currently serving as a full-time firefighter/paramedic with Anderson Township Fire Department. Baldridge previously served as an Adams County Commissioner and prior to that served as a Wayne Township Trustee in Adams County.  He also has served as a firefighter while also working as a farmer, including on a farm owned for seven generations by his family.

In 2018, state Representative Terry Johnson was term limited and unable to run for another term.  Baldridge won a crowded Republican primary for the seat, and went on to win the general election against Democrat Adrienne Buckler with over 61% of the vote.

Baldridge resigned his seat in the House on January 31, 2023 after being appointed Director of the Ohio Department of Agriculture by Governor Mike DeWine.

References

Links 

 Representative Brian Baldridge (official site)

Living people
Republican Party members of the Ohio House of Representatives
1969 births
21st-century American politicians
County commissioners in Ohio